Elastic properties describe the reversible deformation (elastic response) of a material to an applied stress. They are a subset of the material properties that provide a quantitative description of the characteristics of a material, like its strength. 

Material properties are most often characterized by a set of numerical parameters called moduli. The elastic properties can be well-characterized by the Young's modulus, Poisson's ratio, Bulk modulus, and Shear modulus or they may be described by the Lamé parameters.

Young's modulus

Poisson's ratio

Bulk modulus

Shear modulus

References

See also 

Chemical properties
Chemical element data pages